"Before the Worst" is a song by Irish band the Script, released as the fifth and final single from their self-titled debut album, The Script. The Script performed "Before the Worst" during half time of the 2009 NRL Grand Final. The single reached number 10 in Australia and was certified Platinum. The music video was filmed in Belfast, Northern Ireland, and premiered on Channel 4 as part of T4.

Track listings
 7-inch vinyl
 "Before The Worst" – 3:23
 "Bullet From A Gun" – 4:10

 CD single
 "Before The Worst" – 3:23
 "Bullet From A Gun" – 4:10

 Australian CD single
 "Before The Worst" – 3:23
 "Before The Worst" (Armand Van Helden Remix) – 5:46
 "Before The Worst" (Live at the Islington Academy, 8 April 2008) – 4:03
 "Before The Worst" (Demo Version) – 3:11

Charts

Weekly charts

Year-end charts

Certifications

See also
List of top 10 singles for 2009 in Australia

References

2009 singles
The Script songs
2008 songs
Songs about heartache
Songs written by Danny O'Donoghue
Songs written by Mark Sheehan
Sony Music singles
Songs written by Glen Power